"One Nation Under a Groove" is a 1978 song by Funkadelic, the title track from their album of the same name.  It has endured as a dance funk classic and is probably Funkadelic's most widely known song.
"One Nation Under a Groove" was Funkadelic's first million selling single, as well as the third million selling single for the P-Funk organization overall.

Song background
Compared to Funkadelic's earlier output, which was characterized by sound typical for rock music, this song has sound more typical for dance music. The lyrics refer to dancing as a way to freedom.  The song opens with the lyrics "So wide, you can't get around it/ So low, you can't get under it/ So high you can't get over it." Though it is not stated where these lyrics originate, it is quite likely that they come from the traditional gospel song "So High", itself having been previously referenced in The Temptations' song "Psychedelic Shack".

According to Tom Vickers, who served as Minister of Information for Parliament-Funkadelic from 1976 to 1980, during an impromptu performance in front of the United Nations, a woman who accompanied George Clinton to the event witnessed a U.N worker hoisting the flags in front of the building. When Clinton asked the woman what she thought, she replied, "One Nation Under A Groove".

Chart performance
"One Nation Under a Groove" was released as a single and peaked at number twenty-eight on the Billboard Hot 100 and reached number one on the Billboard Soul chart for six weeks, the longest of any number one single released in 1978. On other US charts, it reached thirty-one on the Billboard Club Play Singles chart.  Outside the US, "One Nation Under a Groove" reached the top ten in the UK Singles Charts attaining a peak of number nine in January 1979. It is the band's only UK hit. In Canada, the song reached number 71 in the Top 100 and number 5 on the Dance charts.

Accolades
The song is included in the Rock and Roll Hall of Fame's list of 500 Songs That Shaped Rock and Roll. It is also ranked No. 474 on the Rolling Stone magazine's list of "the 500 Greatest Songs of All Time". It was dropped in the 2010 version but it has been updated to No. 210 in the 2021 version.

Cover versions
The Style Council covered the song in concert during the 1980s, incorporating some of its lyrics into their instrumental song "Dropping Bombs on the White House," originally released in its studio form on their album Café Bleu in 1984. A live recording was later released on their 1998 live album The Style Council in Concert.

References

External links
 [ Allmusic Track Review]
 

Funkadelic songs
1978 singles
Songs written by George Clinton (funk musician)
1978 songs
Funk songs
Songs written by Walter Morrison
Warner Records singles
Songs about dancing